Moths of Guinea-Bissau represent only 2 known moth species. The moths (mostly nocturnal) and butterflies (mostly diurnal) together make up the taxonomic order Lepidoptera.

This is a list of moth species which have been recorded in Guinea-Bissau.

Saturniidae
Imbrasia epimethea (Drury, 1772)

Sphingidae
Acanthosphinx guessfeldti (Dewitz, 1879)

References

External links 
 AfroMoths

Moths
Moths
Guinea-Bissau
Guinea-Bissau